Themes From A Rainy Decade is the first solo album released by Richard Bennett after decades of work as a studio musician and producer, contributing to thousands of recordings for other artists.

In the liner notes to the CD, Mark Knopfler writes: "For almost ten years now I've felt very lucky having Richard Bennett as a pal and as a member of the band. His quiet, self-effacing manner hides an encyclopaedic knowledge of all kinds of roots and rock music, from Hillbilly to Hawaiian, played effortlessly on a variety of instruments which appear out of a flight case as big as an Airstream trailer...... May his cracking guitar playing find a place in your life as it has in mine."

Track listing
All tracks composed by Richard Bennett
 "Riviera"
 "Autumn's Affair"
 "Ashes"
 "The Proud and Profane
 "Dinamico"
 "Aquanetta"
 "The Flaming Palomino"
 "Blue at Best"
 "Hawkins Street"
 "Underworld"
 "A Face No More"
 "Castaway"

Personnel
 Bass - Glenn Worf, George Bradfute, Garry Tallent
 Drums - Chad Cromwell, Phil Lee, Craig Wright
 Keyboards - Dave Hoffner, Reese Wynans
 Vibes - Paul Burch
 Guitars - George Bradfute, Al Casey, Richard Bennett
 Solo Guitar - Richard Bennett

Recording
 Produced by Richard Bennett
 Recorded and mixed by George Bradfute at Tone Chaparral 
 Mastered by Jonathan Russell
 Edited by Eric Conn at Georgetown Masters
 Album Designed by Linsey Sieger, phots by Nick Bennett
 All songs written by Richard Bennett, Moderne Shellac Music

References

External links
Richard Bennett's personal site

2004 debut albums
Richard Bennett (guitarist) albums
Albums produced by Richard Bennett (guitarist)